Isanavarman (fl. 653) was the queen regnant of Champa in ?–653.

She was the daughter of king Kandarpadharma and the sister of king Prabhasadharma.

When Bhadresvaravarman was deposed, she became queen regnant. When Vikrantavarman I ascended the throne of Champa, she went from queen regnant to his queen consort.

References

 George Cœdès (May 1, 1968). The Indianized States of South-East Asia. University of Hawaii Press. ISBN 978-0824803681
 New Book of Tang, vol. 222

 

7th-century women rulers
Kings of Champa
7th-century Vietnamese people